Luxman is a brand name of Japanese , a company that manufactures luxury audio components. Luxman produces a variety of high-end audio products which include turntables, amplifiers, receivers, tape decks, CD players and speakers

History

Lux Corporation was founded in Japan in June 1925, by T. Hayakawa and his brother K. Yoshikawa. The company began as the radio equipment department of Kinsuido Picture Frame Store in Osaka, until then only an importer of picture frames, and was founded just ahead of the first radio broadcast that year.

At the time, Japanese radio listeners were dependent on technology originating in the United States and Europe. Importing radio equipment and parts was a very forward-looking enterprise for Lux.  Lux Corporation later decided that, in order to compete effectively as a supplier, it had to not only sell equipment but manufacture parts in-house to reduce the costs of importing, beginning the creation of the Luxman brand. As a result of this pursuit, Luxman became famous for the output of various quality transformers and switches in Japan, and today is one of the oldest manufacturers in Japan of electronic components, which is reflected in the company's tagline Ultimate Fidelity since 1925.

In the mid-1970s and early 1980s, Luxman rose to prominence in the world hi-fi community, owing to the quality sound produced by its equipment. Luxman were primarily specialists in making vacuum tube amplifiers. One of the traits of Luxman equipment from this era is the quality and warmth of the vacuum tube sound, paired with solid-state electronics and often aesthetic designs. Preamps and power amps such as the Luxman C-05 and M-05, with their finish, electrical designs (copper interconnects, Class A amp design, separately powered channels with dual AC cables, copper-plated chassis).

An engineer by the name of Atsushi Miura married Mari Yoshikawa (Mr. K. Yoshikawa's eldest daughter) and became a part of the founding 'Luxman' family. Atsushi Miura's father was an audio engineer and was head of Luxman for many years in Japan. In the early 1980s Atsushi took over the reins from his father to run Luxman. Sensing the Japanese audio industry was heading towards cheaper mass-produced components and against the founding philosophy of Luxman, Atsushi sold Luxman to Alpine in 1984, before starting the Airtight audio brand.

In 1984 Luxman became part of Alpine Electronics, another Japanese electronics brand. Alpine, wishing to merge their home hi-fi divisions and Alpage brand with Luxman gear, took corporate actions which nearly bankrupted Luxman.  The first of these corporate mistakes was getting Luxman involved in a hi-fi market share war with rival consumer electronics brand Yamaha. Up to the point of the merge, Luxman was revered as a prestigious audio brand; one that sold its equipment in specialist independent hi-fi shops. Post-merge, Luxman looked to sell their products to companies such as Costco (United States) and Richer Sounds (UK) in order to compete with Yamaha. This plan resulted in much confusion amongst consumers, as well as their perception of the brand's values.  Where Luxman's reputation was in high-end and the often expensive markets, its new distributors had reputations for selling in budget and low-value markets, causing problems for existing dealers and consumers loyal to Luxman's values. The second corporate mistake by Alpine was problems with product branding and poor product planning. While Alpine equipment was seen as "okay" and "acceptable" in most consumers' eyes, Luxman was seen as a perfectionist and even elitist brand. The co-branding of cheap and inferior plastic Alpine products with expensive Luxman gear (Luxman equipment was badged Alpine/Luxman) in both Alpine and Luxman factories caused further confusion amongst consumers. This move totally destroyed the image and, ultimately, the sales of Luxman equipment, and the company ended up retreating from all its sales network worldwide except Japan.

Alpine, due to all the troubles it experienced with the Luxman brand, sold it off in 1994. Since that time, the Luxman Corporation has been able to again indulge in its founding objectives, which is simply to create the best audiophile equipment in the world. Today the company still produces vacuum tube equipment, as well as SACD/DVD players, and home stereo equipment.

The company closed the last of the Alpine home hi-fi factories in Hong Kong in 2000 and currently sells mostly to Japan and parts of Asia, outside of Asia to the United Kingdom, Germany and Czech Republic, and Slovakia, since 2005 and currently has a distribution network which includes the United States, France, Poland, Romania, Italy, Denmark, and Sweden.

In 2009, Luxman Corporation was acquired by the International Audio Group Ltd. IAG.

Company milestones

1925 - Lux Corporation founded in Kinsuido Picture Frame Store. Kinsuido Radio Book published - "Read it once and you're a radio expert," runs the blurb to the book that eventually went through 14 editions, helping to promote radios and phonographs in early days.
1928 LUX-735 Radio Set with Magnetic Speaker. Lux markets the LUX-1730 Electric Phonograph
1931 - Magnetic Pickup developed
1952 OY-15 Output Transformer - Lux markets OY-Type transformers, high-regulation power-supply transformers, and many others. All received popular acclaim for delivering the highest performance on the market.
1955 - Crossover Negative Feedback Circuitry developed
1958 The 45/45 stereo record makes its debut.
1958 MA-7A Mono Vacuum-Tube Amplifier. The MA-7A becomes the first fully assembled mono hi-fi power amp marketed by Lux after the war. It featured crossover NFB (Negative Feedback), Lux's worldwide patent.
1961 SQ-5A Vacuum Tube Integrated Amplifier. One of the earliest stereo integrated amplifiers, the SQ-5A proved a hit because of its unique design incorporating a metre and also because of the high-quality sound it delivers. It featured the Lux's unique tone control circuit, still found in current models.
1962 SQ-65 Vacuum Tube Integrated Amplifier. The SQ-65 featured a motional feedback (MFB) circuit, a patented development by Lux that incorporates the motion of the speaker cone into its feedback control system.
1962 PZ-11 Phono Amplifier. The very first phono equaliser amp made in Japan to feature germanium transistors, the PZ-11 was popular for its slim design.
1964 SQ-38D Vacuum Tube Integrated Amplifier. The SQ-38D is one of the first models to feature triodes and also the very first of the "38Series" that eventually includes the SQ-38F, SQ-38FD and the current SQ-38S.
1966 MQ-36 Vacuum Tube OTL Power Amplifier. The MQ-36 is an OTL (Output Transformer-Less) vacuum tube amplifier. It became a long-term seller for its high-quality sound.
1968 SQ-505/507 Integrated Amplifiers. The SQ-505 and SQ-507 are the first of the "500 Series" and the predecessors of Luxman's current L-505s and L-507s.
1971-1980 Luxkit Brand. The LuxKit brand was developed to satisfy the demand of do-it-yourself audiophiles. Lux marketed a total of about 70 kit models, vacuum tube amps, transistor amps, turntables, measuring tools, etc.
1972 Lux establishes L&G. Lux established new audio brand "L&G" to promote a line of colourful high-quality stereo systems designed to fit new lifestyles and created a new dimension in audio enjoyment.
1973 - All-stage Parallel Push System developed.
1975 M-6000 Power Amplifier/C-1000/T110. A product to celebrate Lux's 50th anniversary, the M-6000 represented the company's first serious effort to break into the high-end market. A power amp boasting 300 W x 2 high power and excellent sound, the M-6000 was well received.
1976 Laboratory Reference Series launched which included the 5T50 FM-only tuner, 5G12 graphic equalizer, 5F70 parametric tone control unit, and 5E24 LED power meter; the 5L15 integrated amp; and the 5C50 preamp and 5M21 power amp. The Lux Laboratory Reference Series makes its debut: highlights are the world's first DC-configured amp and synthesized tuner. Each product's functionality, performance and innovative design differentiate the series. After initial production, some of the equipment was specially customised by Lux engineers for even better quality sound, and became sought after.
-World's first DC-configured amp and synthesized tuner
-Computer-controlled cassette deck
-Construction chassis allowing stacking of components
1978 - Duo Beta circuitry
1980 PD-300 Vacuum Suction Turntable. Lux introduces an innovative turntable that uses a vacuum suction system to prevent record warpage and resonance, factors that cause degradation of sound quality.
1981 - CAT - Computer Analysed Tuning System
1982 - Entry-level series 210 and C-05 Pre-amplifier, M-05 Power amplifier launched
1982 D-05 Omega-Loading Cassette Deck. The D-05 appears at the time when the market was moving away from the open-reel format toward the cassette. It boasted the hi-fi performance of an open-reel deck and the ease of use of a cassette deck. The MB-88 limited edition amp (run of 200) was produced. This is one of the last pieces of work Chief Engineer Mr Susumu Uehara, one of Luxman's longest-standing engineers.
At Japan's Tokyo Audio Fair in October, Luxman showed prototypes of the X-3K Cassette deck, X-2A PCM encoder/decoder and X-1D vertical loading CD player also rebadged in Alpine brand-form. These were never put into production.

1983 - K-05 Computer tuning cassette deck launched.
Luxman's first CD player was the DX-104 launched in 1983. This was a design based on the Alpine Electronics AD-7100 and featured a vertical loading tray.

1987 DA-07 Fluency DAC and DP-07 separate CD Transport. Fluency DAC is an application of the function interpolation theory developed by Dr. Toraichi, a professor at Tsukuba University, Japan. The DA-07 became a sensation because its high-speed DSP claimed the recreation of the frequency range not recorded on a CD. KD-117 Digital Audio Tape recorder launched.
1990 - D-500 Top loading CD player launched.
2004 - CU-80 Multi Channel Control Amplifier launched.
2005 - B1000 Monaural Power Amplifier and C1000F Digital Control Amplifiers, 80th Anniversary Commemoration Models launched.
2006 - DU-50 and DU-80 Digital Universal players launched.
2007 - M-800A, L-550A II and L-590A II launched.
2009 - D-08 SA-CD / CD player, SQ-38u (the eleventh generation SQ-38), E-200 (phono stage), P-200 (amplifier) launched.
2011 - PD171 Belt-driven turntable launched. First turntable from Luxman in over 30 years (built until 2016)
2014 - 900u Pre-amplifier and power amplifier launched
2017 - D-380 CD player with tube output stage
2018 - PD171A Turntable launched, successor of PD171
2019 - PD151 Turntable launched.

See also
 List of phonograph manufacturers

References

External links
Luxman Forum at Vintage Audio (includes many brochure and catalog scans)
Luxman Vintage Audio website (site includes a table of manufacturing dates)
Audiotools website on Luxman history
FMTunerInfo site on Luxman tuner history
AudioInvest - site with useful links and information on Luxman
Japanese site with photos of Luxman equipment circa mid 1980s
Private German Luxman site with many classic Hi-Fi pictures & specifications.
 The Exclusive Online Audio Museum "TheVintageKnob" with Luxman Audio Products History, Pictures and Specifications (1960-2000)
 Dedicated Luxman section on Hifishark.com, a search engine devoted to second hand audio equipment.

Electronics companies established in 1925
Audio equipment manufacturers of Japan
Audio amplifier manufacturers
Phonograph manufacturers
Japanese brands
Japanese companies established in 1925
Manufacturing companies based in Yokohama